World Series of Fighting 23: Gaethje vs. Palomino II was a mixed martial arts event to be held  in Phoenix, Arizona, United States. This event aired on NBCSN in the U.S and on Fight Network in Canada.

Background
The main event was a rematch for the WSOF Lightweight Championship between champion and Arizona native Justin Gaethje making his third defense of his title against challenger Luis Palomino. Their first fight at WSOF 19 ended in a TKO victory for Gaethje.

The co-main event featured the tournament final fight for the inaugural WSOF Light Heavyweight Championship between middleweight champion David Branch and Teddy Holder.

This event also was the debut of Chael Sonnen on commentary.

The fight between Estevan Payan and Isaac Vallie-Flagg was canceled after Vallie-Flagg sustained an elbow injury.

Results

Tournament bracket

See also 
 World Series of Fighting
 List of WSOF champions
 List of WSOF events

References

Events in Phoenix, Arizona
World Series of Fighting events
2015 in mixed martial arts
2015 in sports in Arizona